Shahjehan is a Pakistani politician who had been a member of the National Assembly of Pakistan, from June 2013 to May 2018.

Political career

She was elected to the National Assembly of Pakistan as a candidate of National Peoples Party on a seat reserved for women from Sindh in the 2013 Pakistani general election.

References

Living people
Pakistani MNAs 2013–2018
People from Sindh
Women members of the National Assembly of Pakistan
Year of birth missing (living people)
21st-century Pakistani women politicians